Parens scientiarum (Latin: The Mother of Sciences) is the incipit designating a papal bull issued by Pope Gregory IX on April 13, 1231, after the University of Paris strike of 1229. The bull assured the independence and self-governance of the University of Paris, where the pope had studied theology.

Notes

See also 

 University of Paris strike of 1229
 Clerici vagantes
 Authentica habita
 Benefit of clergy

13th-century papal bulls
Documents of Pope Gregory IX
1231 in Europe